The Sun Fast 20 is a French trailerable sailboat that was designed by Polish naval architect Jacek Centkowski as a cruiser-racer and first built in 1985.

The Sun Fast 20 is part of the Sun Fast sailboat range.

Production
The design was built by Jeanneau in France starting in 1985, and Poland starting in 1993. Production in 1999 with 500 boats completed.

Design
The Sun Fast 20 is a recreational keelboat, built predominantly of polyester fiberglass, with the deck having a balsa core. It has a 7/8 fractional sloop rig, with a deck-stepped mast, a single set of swept spreaders and aluminum spars with continuous stainless steel wire rigging. The hull has a slightly raked stem, a walk-through reverse transom, a transom-hung rudder controlled by a tiller and a retractable lifting keel. It displaces  and carries  of cast iron ballast.

The boat is normally fitted with a small outboard motor for docking and maneuvering.

The design has sleeping accommodation for four people, with a double "V"-berth in the bow cabin and two straight settee berths in the main cabin. The head is a portable type and is located in the center of the "V"-berths.

Operational history
The boat was at one time supported by a class club that organized racing events, the Sun Fast Association.

See also
List of sailing boat types

References

External links

Keelboats
1980s sailboat type designs
Sailing yachts
Trailer sailers
Sailboat type designs by Jacek Centkowski
Sailboat types built by Jeanneau